AVHS may refer to:
 Amador Valley High School in Pleasanton, California
 Antelope Valley High School in Lancaster, California
 Apple Valley High School (disambiguation)
Arroyo Valley High School in San Bernardino, California
Assabet Valley High School in Marlborough, Massachusetts